4 Cowley Street is a Grade II listed house in Westminster, London SW1. Previously the headquarters of the Social Democratic Party and the Liberal Democrats, it is now a residential building.

History
The building was constructed in 1904–1905 by the architect Horace Field as offices for the North Eastern Railway.

English Heritage note that, "Lavish late C.17 style, rather out of scale with its neighbours but with fine Arts and Crafts quality of detailing by this early Neo-Georgian revivalist, and no doubt given more importance as it closes the north continuation into Cowley Street of Lord North Street axis."

The building became the headquarters of the SDP (Social Democratic Party) in the 1980s, and following the party's merger with the Liberal Party in 1988, it became home to the Liberal Democrats until 2011.

The building has been restored and refurbished by Saigol DDC as a single family house, rebranded as Mansion House, and is for sale at £36 million.

References

Grade II listed buildings in the City of Westminster
Houses completed in 1905
Liberal Party (UK)
1905 establishments in England